Penicillium malmesburiense is a species of the genus of Penicillium.

References

malmesburiense
Fungi described in 2014